is an interchange passenger railway station located in the city of Higashiōsaka, Osaka Prefecture, Japan, operated by the private railway operator Kintetsu Railway.

Lines
Fuse Station is served by the Osaka Line, and is located 4.1 rail kilometers from the starting point of the line at Ōsaka Uehommachi Station. It is also the nominal terminus of the Nara Line and is 26.7 kilometers from the opposing terminus at Kintetsu Nara Station.

Station layout
The station has four levels; the first two levels are Kintetsu Department Store, the third level is for the Osaka Line, and the fourth level is for the Nara Line. There is an island platform serving 2 tracks between 2 passing tracks each on the third level and the fourth levels.

3rd level

4th level

Adjacent stations

Bus
North
Osaka Municipal Transportation Bureau (Fuse-ekimae)
Route 12 for 
Route 86 for 
Osaka Bus Co., Ltd. (Higashi-Osaka Fuse)
for Kyoto
for Nagoya
for Tokyo
South
Kintetsu Bus Co., Ltd. (Fuse-ekimae)
Bus stop 1
Route 92 (Fuse Route) for 
Bus stop 2
Route 40 (Kami Route) for 
Bus stop 3
Route 54 (Kami-Kosaka Route) for Shoinhigashi-mae (only 1 bus on Saturday mornings)

History
In March 1922 it was renamed , and renamed again to its present name In September 1925. In 1941Daiki merged with Sangu Kyuko Electric Railway Co. and Fuse Station became a train station of Kansai Kyuko Electric Railway Co. (Kankyu), which became part of Kintetsu in 1944.

Passenger statistics
In fiscal 2018, the station was used by an average of 39,370 passengers daily.

Surrounding area
Kintetsu Department Store Higashiosaka

See also
List of railway stations in Japan

References

External links

 Fuse Station 

Railway stations in Japan opened in 1914
Railway stations in Osaka Prefecture
Higashiōsaka